Laura Klaudia Kürthi (born 16 March 2002) is a Hungarian handball player for Váci NKSE and the Hungarian national junior team.

She also represented Hungary in the 2019 European Women's U-17 Handball Championship, were she received gold.

Achievements 
Youth European Championship:
Gold Medalist: 2019

Individual awards
 All-Star Team Best Right Wing of the Youth European Championship: 2019

References

2002 births
Living people
Sportspeople from Győr
Győri Audi ETO KC players
Hungarian female handball players